Senator Derr may refer to:

Alfred M. Derr (1903–1970), Idaho State Senate
Hattie Derr (1905–1994), Idaho State Senate
John W. Derr (born 1941), Maryland State Senate